Thunder into our hearts is the second album of South African group, Jabula released in 1976 on Caroline Records.

Recorded in November and December 1975 at Chalk Farm Studios and Decibel Studios in London it is a further expedition in African tinged jazz.

It features the group and guest musicians: Frank Roberts (keyboards), Nick Evans (Trombone), "Spartacus" (Electric bass), Graeme Morgan (drums), Bob House (clarinet), Ken Ely, Jim Dvorak (trumpet), Mike Rose (Flute).

Track listing

Personnel 

 Acoustic Bass – Ernest Mothle
 Alto Saxophone – Dudu Pukwana
 Backing Vocals – Jim Chambers (tracks: A1, B2, B4), Jimmy Thomas (tracks: A1, B2, B4)
 Clarinet, Alto Saxophone – Bob Howse
 Drums – Graeme Morgan
 Drums [Molombo], Voice, Percussion, Liner Notes – Sebothane Julian Bahula
 Electric Bass – Spartacus R
 Engineer – Rod Howison, Vic Keary
 Flute – Mike Rose (tracks: B4)
 Guitar, Voice, Percussion – Madumetja Lucky Ranku
 Keyboards – Frank Roberts
 Photography By [Jabula] – Herbie Yoshinori Yamaguchi
 Producer – Roy Bedeau
 Sleeve – Cooke Key Associates
 Soprano Saxophone, Tenor Saxophone – Ken Eley
 Trombone – Nick Evans
 Trumpet – Jim Dvorak
 Voice – John Matshikiza (tracks: B1)

References 

1976 albums
Caroline Records albums